Vadym Vadymovych Zhuk (born 15 April 1991) is a Ukrainian professional footballer who plays as a right-back for Bayernliga Nord club Bayern Hof.

Career
Zhuk is the product of the FC Knyazha Shchaslyve academy system.

Desna Chernihiv
From 2012 until 2015, he played for Desna Chernihiv, with whom he won the 2012–13 Ukrainian Second League.

Hirnyk Kryvyi Rih
In 2016 he moved to Hirnyk Kryvyi Rih.

Spartak Subotica
Later in 2016 he moved to Spartak Subotica in the Serbian SuperLiga.

Desna Chernihiv
In 2017 he signed with Desna Chernihiv for the second time. In the 2017–18 season, he helped the team earn promotion to the Ukrainian Premier League.

Poltava
In 2018 he moved to Poltava in the Ukrainian Second League.

Polissya Zhytomyr
In 2020 he moved to Polissya Zhytomyr in the Ukrainian First League.

Desna Chernihiv
On 22 July 2021 he returned to Desna Chernihiv on a one-year contract. On 25 July, he made his Ukrainian Premier League debut against Chornomorets Odesa at the Stadion Yuri Gagarin, replacing Oleksandr Safronov in the 71st minute.

Bayern Hof
On 24 July 2022 he moved to Bayern Hof in the Landesliga Bayern-Nordost. On 29 July he played his first match with the new club against Würzburger FV at the Stadion Grüne Au.

Career statistics

Club

Honours
Desna Chernihiv
 Ukrainian First League: 2017–18
Ukrainian Second League: 2012–13

References

External links
Profile on Official FC Desna Chernihiv website

 

1991 births
Living people
Footballers from Kyiv
Ukrainian footballers
FC Lviv players
FC Lviv-2 players
PFC Sumy players
FC Desna Chernihiv players
FC Hirnyk Kryvyi Rih players
Ukrainian expatriate footballers
Ukrainian expatriate sportspeople in Serbia
FK Spartak Subotica players
Serbian SuperLiga players
Expatriate footballers in Serbia
FC Poltava players
FC Metalist 1925 Kharkiv players
FC Polissya Zhytomyr players
FC Hirnyk-Sport Horishni Plavni players
SpVgg Bayern Hof players
Association football midfielders
Ukrainian Premier League players
Ukrainian First League players
Ukrainian Second League players
Bayernliga players
Expatriate footballers in Germany
Ukrainian expatriate sportspeople in Germany